Seyyed Mohammad Molavi is the representative of Abadan in Islamic Consultative Assembly who was elected on 22 February 2020 in the Majles elections.

Among executive records of Seyyed Mohammad Molavi, are: "the deputy governor of Abadan"; a member in a/the commission (of the parliament) and the second deputy chairman of the "Education and Research Commission".

Seyyed Mohammad Molavi participated in the (11th) elections of the parliament of Iran (in February 2020), and was elected as the first representative of Abadan (with 35,005 votes). Seyyed Mohammad was elected beside two other candidates of Abadan, namely: Seyyed Mojtaba Mahfouzi and Jalil Mokhtar.

See also 
 Seyyed Karim Hosseini
 Jalil Mokhtar
 Seyyed Lefteh Ahmad Nejad
 Seyyed Mojtaba Mahfouzi
 Habib Aghajari

References

Members of the Islamic Consultative Assembly by term
Members of the 11th Islamic Consultative Assembly
People from Abadan, Iran
Living people
Year of birth missing (living people)